Voice (An Acoustic Collection) is a 2010 acoustic album from Delerium's past singles and tracks from previous albums.

The album also includes three new tracks: "Send Me An Angel", "Too Late, Farewell" and "Vienna".

"Voice" was also released as an EP included for free and exclusively with the Sonic Seducer magazine issue 10 of 2010 in Germany.

Track listing
 "Send Me An Angel" featuring Miranda Lee Richards - 3:51
 "Dust In Gravity (Acoustic)" featuring Kreesha Turner - 4:01
 "Too Late, Farewell" featuring Butterfly Boucher - 3:56
 "Silence (Acoustic)" featuring Sarah McLachlan - 5:00
 "Innocente (Acoustic)" featuring Leigh Nash – 6:07
 "Vienna" featuring Elsiane - 5:07
 "Lost and Found (Acoustic)" featuring Jaël - 3:43
 "Flowers Become Screens (Acoustic)" featuring Kristy Thirsk - 5:58
 "Love (Acoustic)" featuring Zoë Johnston - 3:35
 "After All (Acoustic)" featuring Jaël - 3:48
 "Orbit Of Me (Acoustic)" featuring Leigh Nash - 4:26
 "Touched (Acoustic)"  featuring Rachel Fuller - 4:06

 EP - 2010
 "Send Me An Angel" featuring Miranda Lee Richards - 3:51
 "After All (Acoustic)" featuring Jaël - 3:48
 "Flowers Become Screens (Acoustic)" featuring Kristy Thirsk - 5:58
 "Innocente (Acoustic)" featuring Leigh Nash – 6:07
 "Love (Acoustic)" featuring Zoë Johnston - 3:35

References

Delerium albums